Pirimai is a suburb of the city of Napier, in the Hawke's Bay region of New Zealand's eastern North Island. Development of housing began there in 1961–62. The suburb includes Pirimai Park and playground.

Demographics

Pirimai had a population of 3,852 at the 2018 New Zealand census, an increase of 255 people (7.1%) since the 2013 census, and an increase of 171 people (4.6%) since the 2006 census. There were 1,434 households, comprising 1,914 males and 1,938 females, giving a sex ratio of 0.99 males per female, with 879 people (22.8%) aged under 15 years, 789 (20.5%) aged 15 to 29, 1,635 (42.4%) aged 30 to 64, and 555 (14.4%) aged 65 or older.

Ethnicities were 81.3% European/Pākehā, 25.9% Māori, 3.7% Pacific peoples, 4.9% Asian, and 1.6% other ethnicities. People may identify with more than one ethnicity.

The percentage of people born overseas was 13.1, compared with 27.1% nationally.

Although some people chose not to answer the census's question about religious affiliation, 58.5% had no religion, 27.9% were Christian, 2.2% had Māori religious beliefs, 0.8% were Hindu, 0.2% were Muslim, 0.6% were Buddhist and 2.3% had other religions.

Of those at least 15 years old, 399 (13.4%) people had a bachelor's or higher degree, and 648 (21.8%) people had no formal qualifications. 270 people (9.1%) earned over $70,000 compared to 17.2% nationally. The employment status of those at least 15 was that 1,623 (54.6%) people were employed full-time, 408 (13.7%) were part-time, and 105 (3.5%) were unemployed.

References

Suburbs of Napier, New Zealand